Patrick Joseph James Keane (January 6, 1872 – September 1, 1928) was an Irish-born prelate of the Roman Catholic Church.  He served as bishop of the Diocese of Sacramento in California from 1922 until his death in 1928.  Keane previously served as an auxiliary bishop of the same diocese from 1920 to 1922.

Biography

Early life
Born in Ballybunnion, County Kerry, Ireland, Keane studied in 1890–1895 at St. Patrick's College in Carlow, County Carlow, Ireland and The Catholic University of America in Washington, DC where he was granted a Doctor of Divinity in 1896.

Priesthood 
He was ordained a Catholic priest for the Archdiocese of San Francisco on June 20, 1895.  For the next 25 years he was involved in parish work. 

His first assignment, St. Patrick's Parish in San Francisco. The pastor of St. Patrick's, Father Peter Grey had high praise of Keane to Archbishop Riordan. In 1900, Keane was transferred to St. Joseph's Parish in San Francisco. The pastor of St. Joseph, Father Patrick Scanlon died May 31, 1904. Keane served nearly six years under the new pastor, Father Patrick Mulligan at St. Joseph. On March 6, 1910, Archbishop Patrick W. Riordan of San Francisco named Keane, Administrator of St. Francis de Sales Cathedral Parish in Oakland.  On July 30, 1915, Archbishop Edward Hanna appointed Keane, second pastor of St. Francis de Sales.

Auxiliary Bishop and Bishop of Sacramento
On September 10, 1920, Pope Benedict XV named Keane the titular bishop of Sebaste in Palaestina and auxiliary bishop of Sacramento.  He was consecrated a bishop on December 14, 1920 by Archbishop Hanna.  The co-consecrators were Bishops John Cantwell  and Thomas Grace. 

On December 27, 1921, Bishop Grace died. On March 17, 1922, Pope Pius XI named Keane as the third bishop of Sacramento.During the six years he was Bishop of Sacramento, Keane was instrumental in the formation of the parochial school system.  He also founded several new parishes and followed a directive from the Holy See to recruit new priests and vocations from the local diocese.

Death and legacy 
 Patrick Keane died in Sacramento on September 1, 1928 at the age of 56.

References

1872 births
1928 deaths
People from County Kerry
Roman Catholic bishops of Sacramento
Irish emigrants to the United States (before 1923)
Catholic University of America alumni
Alumni of Carlow College
20th-century Roman Catholic bishops in the United States